Vaba Eesti Sõna (Estonian for Free Estonian Word) is an Estonian expatriate weekly newspaper published in New York City, United States established in 1949.

The Nordic Press was founded on 18 January 1949 by August Waldman, August Salony, Mihkel Allik and Boris Rea to publish the newspaper.

The editorial office of Vaba Eesti Sõna is located in New York Estonian House (243 East 34th Street).

See also
Harald Raudsepp, a long-time editor

References

External links
 

1949 establishments in New York City
Newspapers published in New York City
Estonian-language newspapers published in the United States
Estonia–United States relations
Non-English-language newspapers published in New York (state)
Newspapers established in 1949